Ambrosius Arnold Willem Hubrecht (2 March 1853, in Rotterdam – 21 March 1915, in Utrecht) was a Dutch zoologist.

Hubrecht studied zoology at Utrecht University with Harting and Donders,  for periods joining Selenka in Leiden and later Erlangen, and Gegenbauer in Heidelberg. He graduated magna cum laude with Harting in 1874 with a study on nemertine worms. In 1875–1882 he worked at the Rijksmuseum van Natuurlijke Historie in Leiden, where he was the curator of ichthyology and herpetology, and in 1882 became professor at Utrecht. In 1890–1891 he traveled in Java, Sumatra, and Borneo, where he made embryological studies, notably on the tarsier. He visited the United States in 1896 and 1907. Honorary degrees were conferred on him by Princeton University, the University of St Andrews, the University of Dublin, the University of Glasgow (LL.D 1901), and the University of Giessen.

Hubrecht´s most important work was in embryology and placentation of the mammals. In papers in the Quarterly Journal of Microscopial Science in 1883 and 1887 he put forth the theory—also held by Sir E. Ray Lankester—that the vertebrates originated in a Nemertine form, basing this on his discovery in the Nemertines of a continuous nerve sheath. The Descent of the Primates (1897) is the title under which were published his lectures at the sesquicentennial celebration at Princeton.

In 1883 he became member of the Royal Netherlands Academy of Arts and Sciences. Hubrecht founded the Institut Internationale d'Embryologie, today known as the International Society of Developmental Biologists.

Sources

References

External links

1853 births
1915 deaths
Dutch zoologists
Developmental biologists
Dutch non-fiction writers
Members of the Royal Netherlands Academy of Arts and Sciences
Scientists from Rotterdam
Utrecht University alumni
Academic staff of Utrecht University